Ghafurov District is a district in the northern part of Sughd Region, Tajikistan. Its capital is Ghafurov, a town in the south of the district. The district surrounds, but does not include the cities Khujand (the regional capital), Istiqlol (in the north), Buston (formerly Chkalovsk, in the south), and Guliston (formerly Kayrakkum), also in the south, which gave its name to the adjacent Kayrakkum Reservoir. 

The district has a population of 380,500 (as of 2020), with 95% classified as rural. It produced 19,500 tons of raw cotton in 2007, accounting for 16% of total cotton production in Sughd province and nearly 5% of Tajikistan's cotton production.

Administrative divisions
They are as follows:

References

Districts of Tajikistan
Sughd Region